Justice Stern may refer to:

Horace Stern, associate justice and chief justice of the Supreme Court of Pennsylvania
Leonard J. Stern, associate justice of the Ohio Supreme Court